The Lure of the Circus is a 1918 American adventure film serial directed by J. P. McGowan for Universal.

Cast
 Eddie Polo as Eddie Somers
 Eileen Sedgwick as Alicia Page
 Molly Malone as Nan Harden - Chapters 1 thru 5
 Harry Carter as Edward Lawrence
 Noble Johnson as Silent Andy
 Fred Starr as Steve Harden (as Frederick Starr)
 Duke R. Lee as Richard Van Norman
 Charles Hill Mailes as Malcolm Somers
 James Gordon as Guy Brock
 Andrew Waldron as Dynamite Dan
 Fred Montague as Howard Mason
 Sydney Deane as Reynolds (as Sidney Deane)
 Josie Sedgwick

Chapter Titles
 The Big Tent
 The Giant's Leap
 Beaten Back
 The Message On The Cuff
 The Lip Reader
 The Aerial Disaster
 The Charge of The Elephant
 The Human Ladder
 The Flying Loop
 A Shot For Life
 The Dagger
 A Strange Escape
 A Plunge For Life
 Flames
 The Stolen Record
 The Knockout
 A Race With Time
 The Last Trick

See also
 List of film serials
 List of film serials by studio

References

External links

1918 films
1918 adventure films
American silent serial films
American black-and-white films
Circus films
Films directed by J. P. McGowan
Universal Pictures film serials
American adventure films
1910s American films
Silent adventure films
1910s English-language films